The South Korea national American football team is the official American football team for South Korea and controlled by the Korea American Football Association.

IFAF World Championship record

2015 Canton, Ohio

Schedule and Scores

See also

 Korea American Football Association
 International Federation of American Football
 2007 IFAF World Cup

Notes

External links

  KAFA
 

Men's national American football teams
American football
American football in South Korea
American football teams established in 1946
1946 establishments in Korea